The Tahquamenon Falls State Park is a  state park in the U.S. state of Michigan. It is the second largest of Michigan's state parks. Bordering on Lake Superior, most of the park is located within Whitefish Township in Chippewa County, with the western section of the park extending into McMillan Township in Luce County. The nearest town of any size is Paradise.

Tahquamenon Falls State Park follows the Tahquamenon River as it passes over Tahquamenon Falls and drains into Whitefish Bay, Lake Superior. The Tahquamenon Falls include a single  drop, the Upper Falls, plus the cascades and rapids collectively called the Lower Falls.

The North Country Trail passes through the park. There is a seasonal shuttle service that allows hikers to walk between upper falls and lower falls without doubling back, the Tahqua Trekker.

Tahquamenon Falls is also called Rootbeer Falls because of its golden-brown color, caused by tannins from cedar swamps that drain into the river. In winter, the ice that accumulates around and in the falls is often colored in shades of green and blue.

Row boats and canoes are rented to use to approach the lower falls. The upper falls are accessible from the visitor center parking lot via a paved walking trail. There are five campgrounds in the park with a total of 350 campsites. The park receives as many as 500,000 visitors per year, many of whom drive in on the state park's only paved road, M-123. M-123 intersects with Interstate 75 at exit 352.

Nearby attractions include the Great Lakes Shipwreck Museum at Whitefish Point, and the Point Iroquois Light and Museum at Bay Mills on Whitefish Bay.

References

External links

 Tahquamenon Falls State Park Michigan Department of Natural Resources
 Tahquamenon Falls Education Programs Michigan DNR

Protected areas of Chippewa County, Michigan
Protected areas of Luce County, Michigan
State parks of Michigan
Protected areas established in 1947
1947 establishments in Michigan
IUCN Category V